Molly Stark Lake is a lake in Otter Tail County, in the U.S. state of Minnesota. The lake was named for Molly Stark, the wife of American Revolutionary War general John Stark.

See also
List of lakes in Minnesota

References

Lakes of Otter Tail County, Minnesota
Lakes of Minnesota